Reformation is the second full-length studio album from the Finnish heavy metal band Kiuas. Released on May 24, 2006 by Spinefarm Records, some versions include a cover of Jethro Tull's “Hunting Girl.”

Track listing
 "Race with the Falcons" − 4:47
 "Through the Ice Age" − 3:58
 "The New Chapter" − 4:25
 "Of Ancient Wounds" − 3:33
 "Child of Cimmeria" − 1:06
 "Black Winged Goddess" − 5:21
 "Heart of the Serpent" − 4:55
 "Bleeding Strings" − 5:50
 "Call of the Horns" − 3:39
 "Reformation" − 6:12
 "Hunting Girl" (Jethro Tull cover) − 5:09

Personnel

Band members
 Ilja Jalkanen − vocals
 Mikko Salovaara − guitars
 Markku Näreneva − drums
 Atte Tanskanen − keyboards
 Teemu Tuominen − bass guitar

Guest musicians
Choirs by:
 Kimmo Blom
 Aleksi Parviainen
 Pete "Vessaharja" Aho

Musicians in individual songs:
 Niko Kalliojärvi − berzerker vocals on Track 6
 Euge Valovirta − guest guitar solo on Track 8
 Janne "Crab" Lehikoinen − guest guitar solo on Track 8
 Jaana Ranta − flute on Track 10
 Karoliina Tiuraniemi − violin on Tracks 6 and 10
 Essi Toivonen − violin, cello on Tracks 6 and 10
 Dr. Evil − black mass on Track 10

Production and other
 All music and lyrics by Mikko Salovaara.
 Cover art by Janne "ToxicAngel" Pitkänen.
 Mixed by Nino Laurenne at Sonic Pump Studios March 2006.
 Mastered by Mika Jussila at Finnvox Studios.

References

2006 albums
Kiuas albums
Spinefarm Records albums